Whitefriars was a Carmelite friary on the lower slopes of St Michael's Hill, Bristol, England. It was established in 1267; in subsequent centuries a friary church was built and extensive gardens developed. The establishment was dissolved in 1538.

Much of the site was then redeveloped by Sir John Young, who built a "Great House" there.  This later became a boys' school founded by Edward Colston in the 18th century. The Red Lodge, which survives today as a museum, had its origins as a prospect house for the Prior. The Colston Hall, a venue for concerts, was built on part of the friary site in the 19th century. A 20th-century office block named Whitefriars, built a short distance way, preserves the name.

History
Whitefriars was founded in 1267 by the Prince of Wales, the future king Edward I. The friars, also known as Friars of the Blessed Virgin, wore white habits, hence the name Whitefriars. The friary was described by the antiquary Leyland, writing in the early sixteenth century, as standing on the right bank of the Frome by the quay. He added that it was "the fairest friary in England". The friary had a large expanse of adjoining land extending up St Michael's Hill. This was used for horticulture and the Carmelites sold produce to augment their income.

Writing to Thomas Cromwell in 1538, Richard Yngworth, one of the commissioners or visitors charged with inspecting monastic houses, reported that the contents of the friary only just met the debts owed by the friars. He described a chapel with lead roofing, gardens and a "goodly howse in byldenge, mete for a great man", also a conduit bringing fresh water from Brandon Hill, later taken over by St John's Church. Four remaining friars surrendered their possessions to the commissioner in the presence of the Mayor.

Post-dissolution
Some monastic cells, thought to belong to the friary, survive under the Red Lodge, which had its origins as a prospect house for the prior of Whitefriars. This building became the lodge house of an Elizabethan mansion, the Great House, built in the late 16th century by John Young, who had bought the friary from Bristol Corporation after the Dissolution of the Monasteries. The Great House was where Elizabeth I stayed, as a guest of John Young, in 1574. In the 18th century, the house was acquired by Edward Colston, who established the original Colston's School there. After the school moved to Stapleton in 1857, the Colston Hall Society purchased the premises, and demolished the house to build the Colston Hall, which now occupies the site. Excavations during the building of the adjacent Colston House in the early 20th century found medieval walls, burials and floor tiles.

As part of the post-war redevelopment of Bristol city centre, the name Whitefriars was given to a large multi-storey office development located in Lewin's Mead, a few hundred yards from the site of the original Whitefriars and adjoining the site of the Greyfriars office complex. It was completed in 1976.

References

Works cited

Friaries in Bristol
1256 establishments in England
Former buildings and structures in Bristol